Alfred Edward Appleton (18 April 1882 – 27 June 1973) was an Australian rules footballer who played for the Fitzroy Football Club in the Victorian Football League (VFL).

Notes

External links
		

1882 births
1973 deaths
Australian rules footballers from Victoria (Australia)
Fitzroy Football Club players
Ballarat Football Club players